The Washington Carbon Emissions Fee and Revenue Allocation Initiative, also known as Initiative 1631 or the Protect Washington Act was a ballot initiative that appeared on ballots in the State of Washington in the November 2018 election. The initiative proposed to reduce pollution by levying a fee on greenhouse gas emissions generated within the state of Washington, and using that revenue to support air quality and energy projects, as well as water quality and forest health initiatives. The measure failed with 56.3% of voters rejecting it. As of 2018, more had been spent in campaigning for and against the initiative than on any other ballot measure in Washington history.

Ballot title
The ballot title was as follows:

Measure design
The measure stated that, beginning on January 1, 2020, a fee of $15 would be enacted on each metric ton of carbon emitted in the state of Washington. The fee would increase by $2 every year until the state's greenhouse gas emissions target for 2035 is met, and the state's emissions target for 2050 is on track to be met. These goals had previously been set by the Washington State Legislature, which passed a law in 2008 that required the state to reduce its emissions to 1990 levels by 2020, 25% below 1990 levels by 2035, and 80% below 1990 levels by 2050. As of 2018, the state is not on track to achieve those goals.

Background
Environmental advocates in Washington had previously attempted to pass carbon pricing measures. Washington Initiative 732, a "tax swap" proposal to levy a tax on carbon emissions and simultaneously reduce the state's sales tax, had appeared on the ballot in the 2016 election, but failed to pass. Initiative 1631 differed in that it proposed to use revenue from carbon fees to invest in projects to reduce pollution. These include projects related to transportation, energy efficiency, carbon sequestrations in farms and forests, and clean energy. The initiative also proposed to invest over $250 million in climate adaptation in the areas of forestry and water conservation. The particular projects funded would be determined by a board appointed by the Governor of Washington that would be directed to invest 70% of the revenue in clean energy.

Support
The initiative was drafted by a broad coalition of labor, faith, social justice, health, tribal, and environmental justice groups, such as Front and Centered, a coalition of people of color and low-income people advocating for a just transition. It was also supported by Carbon Washington, the organization that had put Initiative 732 on the ballot. Other organizations that supported the initiative included Stand.earth, The Nature Conservancy, and local chapters of 350.org and the Sierra Club. Elected officials who supported this initiative included United States Representative Pramila Jayapal and Washington Governor Jay Inslee.

Opposition
The "No on 1631" campaign was sponsored by the Western States Petroleum Association. The American Fuel and Petrochemical Manufacturers and its members spent over $30 million to defeat the measure. Companies that funded the campaign against the initiative included Cascade Natural Gas, BP, Royal Dutch Shell, Chevron, and Phillips 66.  Atmospheric sciences professor Cliff Mass opposed the initiative.

Others opposed the measure because section 9(c) specifically exempted "Fossil fuels directly or eventually supplied to a light and power business for purposes of generating electricity" from the carbon tax. This meant that coal, gas, and diesel power plants would not directly be responsible for paying the carbon tax. However the majority of electricity generation in Washington state is derived from renewable sources. A 2017 report by The Washington Post indicated that 68% of electricity generated in Washington state comes from hydropower and 7% is from wind turbines. The same analysis further indicated that only 4% of Washington's energy comes from burning coal, all of which is generated by the Centralia Power Plant. This plant will begin phasing out its two coal boilers beginning in the year 2020 and transition completely to natural gas by the year 2025. Natural gas currently accounts for only 10% of Washington's energy generation, according to the Washington Post analysis.

Ultimately, the initiative did not pass during the 2018 November election.

References

2018 Washington (state) ballot measures
Government of Washington (state)